Ubethilke Anuruddha (born 21 January 1990) is a Sri Lankan cricketer. He made his first-class debut for Bloomfield Cricket and Athletic Club in the 2016–17 Premier League Tournament on 27 January 2017. He made his List A debut for Anuradhaura District in the 2016–17 Districts One Day Tournament on 15 March 2017.

References

External links
 

1990 births
Living people
Sri Lankan cricketers
Anuradhaura District cricketers
Bloomfield Cricket and Athletic Club cricketers
Cricketers from Colombo